Irma M. Wyman (January 31, 1928 - November 17, 2015) was an early computer engineer and the first woman to become vice president of Honeywell, Inc. She was a systems thinking tutor and was the first female CIO of Honeywell.

Academic life
In 1945, Wyman received a Regents Scholarship and was accepted into the College of Engineering at the University of Michigan as one of seven female students. To supplement her scholarship, she worked as a switchboard operator and waitress.

At the time, women in engineering programs received little encouragement and support. While her grades qualified her for membership in Tau Beta Pi, the engineering honor society, she received only a "Women's Badge", since the society did not admit women at the time. Wyman graduated with a Bachelor of Science/EM degree in 1949.

Career

Computing Future Thought Leadership
While still a junior in college, Wyman worked on a missile guidance project at the Willow Run Research Center.  To calculate trajectory, they used mechanical calculators.  She visited the U.S. Naval Proving Ground where Grace Hopper was working on similar problems and discovered they were using a prototype of a programmable Mark II computer developed at Harvard University. She became interested in computers and later recalled that "I became an enthusiastic pioneer in this new technology and it led to my life's career."

After graduation, she joined a start-up company that was eventually acquired by Honeywell Information Systems. She moved to Minneapolis and began a long management career at Honeywell, eventually serving as chief information officer. She became vice president of Honeywell Corporate Information Management (CIM) before retiring in 1990.

Wyman then began a second career as archdeacon in the Minnesota Diocese of the Episcopal Church where she coached servant leadership, retiring again after ten years as Archdeacon of the Diocese of Minnesota.

Wyman supported research and planning as a thought leader in futures studies. As an aside to this, she contended to an interviewer in 1979, that
it's just as important to know when to ignore all the careful planning and seize an opportunity.

Wyman endowed the Irma M. Wyman Scholarship at the University of Michigan's Center for the Education of Women to support women in engineering, computer science and related fields. Irma's persistent advocacy for women in computer science reflects those of her early career mentor:

Awards and honors

 Michigan Engineering Alumni Society Medal - 2001
 Honorary Doctor of Engineering, University of Michigan - 2007

Quote
We never get a second chance to make a first impression. (1983–1987)
When sponsoring Honeywell's innovative Corporate Information Management Information Security Awareness Program (ISAP).

See also
 Harvard Mark II
 Women in computing
 Women in engineering

References

External links

People from Saint Paul, Minnesota
American women computer scientists
American computer scientists
1928 births
2015 deaths
University of Michigan College of Engineering alumni
American women business executives
Chief information officers
20th-century American Episcopalians
20th-century American women
21st-century American women